A vector addition system (VAS)  is one of several mathematical modeling languages for the description of distributed systems. Vector addition systems were introduced by Richard M. Karp and Raymond E. Miller in 1969, and generalized to vector addition systems with states (VASS) by John E. Hopcroft and Jean-Jacques Pansiot in 1979. Both VAS and VASS are equivalent in many ways to Petri nets introduced earlier by Carl Adam Petri.   Reachability in vector addition systems is  Ackermann-complete (and hence  nonelementary).

Informal definition 

A vector addition system consists of a finite set of integer vectors. An initial vector is seen as the initial values of multiple counters, and the vectors of the VAS are seen as updates. These counters may never drop below zero. More precisely, given an initial vector with non negative values, the vectors of the VAS can be added componentwise, given that every intermediate vector has non negative values. A vector addition system with states is a VAS equipped with control states. More precisely, it  is a finite directed graph with arcs labelled by integer vectors. VASS have the same restriction that the counter values should never drop below zero.

Formal definitions and basic terminology 

Transitions 

 Let  be a VAS.
 Let  be a VASS.

See also 
 Petri net
 Finite state machine
 Communicating finite-state machine
 Kahn process networks
 Process calculus
 Actor model
 Trace theory

References 

Formal specification languages
Models of computation
Concurrency (computer science)
Diagrams
 
Software modeling language